Carntierna is a ringfort and National Monument located in County Cork, Ireland.

Location

Carntierna is located atop Corrin Hill in the Nagle Mountains, 2.4 km (1.5 mi) south of Fermoy.

History and description
Carntierna was built between 500 BC and AD 500, during Ireland's Iron Age; it is one of only three "hillforts" in north Cork. The name is Irish for "Tigernac's cairn", named after Tigernac Tetbannach, legendary King of Munster in the time of Conchobar mac Nessa.

A great cairn lies atop the hill, supposedly the king's burial-place.

References

National Monuments in County Cork
Archaeological sites in County Cork